Carlos Heredia may refer to:

 Carlos Heredia (economist) (born 1956), Mexican economist and academic
 Carlos Heredia (footballer) (born 1998), Dominican football winger

See also
 Juan Carlos Heredia (born 1952), Spanish football forward